Kononovo is a rural locality (a village) in Andreyevskoye Rural Settlement, Vashkinsky District, Vologda Oblast, Russia. The population was 31 as of 2002.

Geography 
Kononovo is located 24 km north of Lipin Bor (the district's administrative centre) by road. Davydovo is the nearest rural locality.

References 

Rural localities in Vashkinsky District